William Matthew Moore (11 September 1897 – 3 February 1976) was a member of the Queensland Legislative Assembly.

Biography
Moore was born at Miles, Queensland, the son of Patrick Moore and his wife Elizabeth Ann (née Cleary) and was educated in Miles and Brisbane. He was a schoolteacher for thirteen years and an inspector for the State Government Insurance Office. From 1933 to 1940 he was a private businessman. He died in February 1976 and was buried in the Pinnaroo Lawn Cemetery.

Public career
When the sitting member for Merthyr, James Keogh died in 1940 a by-election was held. Moore, the Labor Party candidate, defeated the UAP candidate and previous member for Merthyr, Patrick Kerwin. In 1957, Moore had joined with Premier, Vince Gair and most of his cabinet in forming the breakaway QLP. An election was called later in the year and he was defeated by the Liberal Party's Ray Ramsden.

During his time in government, Moore held the following portfolios:
 Acting Secretary for Labour and Industry 1948-1949 
 Secretary for Mines and Immigration 1949-1950
 Secretary for Health and Home Affairs 1950-1957
 
When Queensland's free hospital scheme was under attack by the federal government in the 1950s Moore fought tooth and nail to successfully retain it. He was also the member responsible for the Health Acts Amendment Act 1955 which banned the manufacture, sale or use of paint containing white lead.

References

Members of the Queensland Legislative Assembly
Australian Labor Party members of the Parliament of Queensland
Queensland Labor Party members of the Parliament of Queensland
20th-century Australian politicians

1897 births
1976 deaths
Burials at Pinnaroo Cemetery, Brisbane